Léconi Park, is a private wildlife and agricultural park in Lékoni in south-east Gabon in Africa.

Parks in Gabon
Haut-Ogooué Province